Mir Qaleh (also Romanized as Mīr Qal‘eh) is a village in Dibaj Rural District, Lotfabad District, Dargaz County, Razavi Khorasan Province, Iran. At the 2006 census, its population was 177, in 56 families.

References 

Populated places in Dargaz County